Grass by the Home is a 1983 song by former Soviet and Russian music group Zemlyane. The lyrics were written by Anatoly Poperechny and music by Vladimir Migulya. The song tells about cosmonauts in space, longing for Earth, along with their homes and the grass.

In 2009, the Russian Federal Space Agency named "Grass by the Home" the official anthem of Russian cosmonauts.

The song was the finalist of the 1983 edition of Song of the Year. In 1984, it was used in the 14th episode of Well, Just You Wait! (Nu, pogodi).

On May 31, 2020, on the day of the first launch of the SpaceX crewed spacecraft, a modified video of the Zemlyane group and a deepfake Elon Musk with the song Grass by the House became a hit in the Russian segment of the Internet. In an interview with the Moskva Speaks radio station, Sergei Skachkov, spoke positively about the video and wished “everyone sang the song: the Chinese, the Japanese".

In April 2020, the unregistered Russian political party VKPB announced the translation of the song "Grass near the House" into Japanese. On April 14, 2021, a Yiddish translation of the song was published in the Russian newspaper Birobidzhaner Stern. The Internet version of the article is accompanied by a link to a video with the translation of the song and also contains a literary translation into English.

References

External links
 «Трава у дома». Как был написан первый гимн советских космонавтов?

1983 songs
Soviet songs